Ghamalia are a Hindu Kurmi Peasant Community associated with Agriculture (Krishi Karmi Jāti) in India.  Kurmis of Bihar and Uttar Pradesh are divided into different subcastes e.g. Awadhiya, Samaswar, Ghamalia, Konchasia, Joshwar, Sindriya, etc.

Kudmis from Chotanagpur have migrated somewhere from Central India where they have their original relative Kunbis.

References

Agricultural castes